Zaytsevo is a rural locality (a khutor) in Gubkinsky District, Belgorod Oblast, Russia. The population was 91 as of 2010. There are 3 streets.

Geography 
Zaytsevo is located 46 km southwest of Gubkin (the district's administrative centre) by road. Yuryevka is the nearest rural locality.

References 

Rural localities in Gubkinsky District